Belgian railway line 161 is the railway line connecting the Belgian capital city Brussels to Namur. The line first opened on August 12, 1854 between the Brussels-Luxembourg and La Hulpe railway stations, and was completed on October 23, 1856.

The line goes through the following stations:
 Brussels-North
 Brussels-Schuman
 Brussels-Luxembourg
 Etterbeek
 Watermael
 Boitsfort
 Groenendaal
 Hoeilaart
 La Hulpe
 Genval
 Rixensart
 Profondsart
 Ottignies
 Mont-Saint-Guibert
 Blanmont
 Chastre
 Ernage
 Gembloux
 Lonzée
 Beuzet
 Saint-Denis-Bovesse
 Rhisnes
 Namur

References

161
161
City of Brussels
Namur (city)
Railway lines opened in 1854
1854 establishments in Belgium
3000 V DC railway electrification